Harry Lyon (died March 1984) was an English non-league footballer. Clubs he played for include Burscough, Wigan Athletic and Chorley (as player-manager).

For Wigan, he holds the records for most goals in a season (66 in 1964–65) and most goals overall (273).

References

Year of birth unknown
1984 deaths
English footballers
Association football forwards
Burscough F.C. players
Wigan Athletic F.C. players
Chorley F.C. players